The Italian Hockey League Women, previously called the Serie A during 1990 to 2017, is the top level of women's ice hockey in Italy. It was founded in 1990 by the Federazione Italiana Sport del Ghiaccio. The EVB Eagles Südtirol are the most successful team in league history, having won eleven Italian Championships.

Teams

2022–23 season

Former teams
 HC Agordo, Agordo (1991–2013)
 Alleghe Hockey Girls, Alleghe (2014–2019)
 HC All Stars Piemonte, Turin (2000–2009)
 Valpellice (2000–01)
 Asiago Hockey 1935, Asiago (2009–10)
 HC Brixen-Bressanone, Brixen (2002–03)
 HC Como, Como (1999–2007 & 2015–2019)
 HC Crocodiles Girls Merano, Merano (2001–2004)
 HC Diavoli Black Widows, Sesto San Giovanni (2012–13)
 HC Eagles Bolzano, Bozen (1996–2008)
 SHC Fassa Girls, Canazei (1999–2002)
 Fassa-Gardena (1999–2000)
 HC Feltreghiaccio, Feltre (2013–14)
 Padova Waves Girls, Padua (2021–22)
 Real Torino HC, Turin (2009–2015)
 Torino Bulls, Turin (2014–2019)

Champions
1990–91 Alleghe Femminile
1991–92 HC Agordo
1992–93 HC Agordo
1993–94 HC Agordo
1994–95 Alleghe Femminile
1995–96 HC Agordo
1996–97 HC Eagles Bolzano
1997–98 HC Eagles Bolzano
1998–99 HC Eagles Bolzano
1999–2000 HC Eagles Bolzano
2000–01 HC Agordo
2001–02 HC Agordo
2002–03 HC Agordo
2003–04 HC Eagles Bolzano
2004–05 HC Eagles Bolzano
2005–06 HC Eagles Bolzano
2006–07 HC Agordo
2007–08 HC Agordo
2008–09 HC Agordo
2009–10 EV Bozen Eagles
2010–11 EV Bozen Eagles
2011–12 EV Bozen Eagles
2012–13 EV Bozen Eagles
2013–14 EV Bozen Eagles
2014–15 EV Bozen Eagles
2015–16 EV Bozen Eagles
2016–17 EVB Eagles Südtirol
2017–18 EVB Eagles Südtirol
2018–19 Alleghe Hockey Girls
2019–20 playoffs cancelled due to COVID-19 pandemic
2020–21 EVB Eagles Südtirol
2021–22 EVB Eagles Südtirol

Titles by team

External links
Hockeytime.net

 

Women
Italy
Women's sports leagues in Italy
Women's ice hockey competitions in Italy
Sports leagues established in 1990